"Cry Just a Little Bit" is a song originally a hit for British singer Shakin' Stevens in 1983 from his release The Bop Won't Stop, reaching #3 in the UK charts. and #67 on the Billboard Hot 100 charts in the United States.

Sylvia version

A cover single by American country music artist Sylvia was released in June 1985, and was the second single from the album One Step Closer.  The song reached #9 on Billboard Hot Country Singles & Tracks chart.

Chart performance
Shakin' Stevens

Sylvia

Certifications

References

1985 singles
Shakin' Stevens songs
Sylvia (singer) songs
Epic Records singles
RCA Records Nashville singles
Song recordings produced by Brent Maher
1983 songs
Songs written by Bob Heatlie